Phoenix Property Investors ("Phoenix") is a real estate investment firm headquartered in Hong Kong. In 2022, IREI ranked Phoenix as the tenth largest real estate manager in Asia based on assets under management.

Background 
Phoenix was founded in 2002 by Samuel Chu and Benjamin Lee. The firm takes a value driven approach to investing in real estate in and works with institutional clients such as sovereign wealth funds, pension funds and insurance companies. 

Phoenix has investments across 18 cities across asia in countries such as China, Japan, Korea and Australia. While investments are predominately in North Asia, Phoenix has also been growing its investments in Southeast Asia. The firm is headquartered in Hong Kong with additional offices in China, Japan, Korea, Singapore, Taiwan and Australia.

In 2020, Phoenix had to restructure its financing for investments in Beijing and Shanghai due to market turndown caused by the COVID-19 pandemic.

The most notable property owned by Phoenix is Tower 535 located in Causeway Bay, Hong Kong. It served as the flagship store of DJI in Hong Kong until August 16, 2021.

Funds

References

External links 
 

2002 establishments in Hong Kong
Companies established in 2002
Companies of Hong Kong
Financial services companies established in 2002
Investment companies of Hong Kong
Private equity firms of Asia-Pacific